Garrison Cemetery may refer to:

Canada
 Garrison Cemetery (Annapolis Royal, Nova Scotia)

Denmark
 Garrison Cemetery, Copenhagen

United States
 Garrison Cemetery (Cheektowaga, New York), property listed on the National Register of Historic Places in Erie County, New York